The Heritage Reformed Congregations (HRC) constitute a continental Calvinist denomination in the United States and Canada. They were established in 1993 by dissidents from the Netherlands Reformed Congregations under the leadership of Pastor Joel Beeke.

History 

The Heritage Reformed Congregations were formed in 1993 by dissidents from the Netherlands Reformed Congregations, under the leadership of Joel Beeke. Originally, the denomination was called the Heritage Netherlands Reformed Congregations. The current name was adopted in 2005.

In 1995, the denomination founded the Puritan Reformed Theological Seminary. Later, the seminary was supported by the Free Reformed Churches of North America (FRCNA).

Starting in the 2010s, the denomination began a dialogue with the FRCNA about a possible denominational merger. In 2017, the two denominations held simultaneous synods, in the same place, to discuss the approximation.

Doctrine 

The HRC adopts the Three Forms of Unity (Heidelberg Catechism, Belgic Confession, and Canons of Dort) as its official doctrine. The denomination advocates Biblical inerrancy and opposes the ordination of women.

Inter-church Relations 

The denomination is a member of the North American Presbyterian and Reformed Council and the International Conference of Reformed Churches.

Congregations
The Heritage Reformed Congregations consist of the following congregations:

References 

Reformed denominations in the United States
Calvinist denominations established in the 20th century
Religious organizations established in 1993